Sherborne Preparatory School is a non-selective co-educational preparatory school in the town of Sherborne, Dorset in southern England. It is an independent preparatory school which merged with Sherborne School in April 2021. It continues to benefit from close links with the nearby Sherborne Girls. Pupils generally go on to other independent schools with a large proportion moving onto the Sherborne Schools as well as other schools, predominantly in South West England.

History
Sherborne Prep was founded in 1858 by Reverend A C Clapin, who was a housemaster at Sherborne School. The Headmaster Hugo Harper had asked him to establish a junior house at the school to educate younger boys. The school outgrew its premises over the next few decades. In 1885, it moved out to its own premises and became a fully independent preparatory school. It became coeducational during the 1970s, following a trend set by many previously single-sex independent schools. Until 1998, it was privately run before being turned over to a charitable trust. The school merged with Sherborne School in April 2021.

Present School 
The school is divided into three parts: Nursery, Pre-Prep and Prep.

Nursery
Taking children from the age of 2 to 4 years old, the Nursery facility is located within the grounds of Sherborne Prep with sessions starting at 8.15am and finishing at 3.45pm with an option to stay until 5pm in the Pre-Prep facility.

Pre-Prep 
From Reception to Year 2, children are taught a broad curriculum with languages, music, IT, sport and swimming taught by subject specialists. At Year 1 the children begin Inspire Maths, a Singapore approach to teaching Maths. Languages are taught using the communicative approach. Reception children also have lessons in conversational Italian.
All Pre-Prep children take part in some form of physical activity every day including aerobics, gymnastics, tennis, hockey, netball, rounders, football, tag rugby and athletics.

Core values
The school has six core values: kindness, perseverance, awareness, generosity, honesty, and independence.

Boarding
Full, Weekly and Flexi Boarding is offered from Year 3 upwards. The boarding house is located within the centre of the school and is a co-ed facility with girls and boys sharing joint common rooms, overseen by a Housemaster, his wife and three young children who live in separate accommodation within the boarding house.

Houses 
The school has four houses; Normans, Greeks, Trojans and Romans. Day pupils are also assigned a house, and boarders do not live in their 'houses' as at senior schools.

Facilities and Activities 
The campus is made up of one main building containing the Prep Classrooms, an Art Room, ICT Suite, Library, Assembly and Dining Hall, Music Rooms and Sports Hall. The Boarding House is contained within this building. Science and DT are in a separate building, as is the Pre-Prep and Nursery Facility. The grounds also contain a playground, pond dipping area, an Astro Turf, 2 x netball courts and a large sports field. For Rugby, Hockey and Rounders, Sherborne Prep also uses the Sherborne School pitches as well as its Cricket nets in the summer.

There are a lunchtime clubs including dance and ballet, golf and tennis coaching.
Music specialists introduce the children to music theory and composition. In addition there are numerous music clubs, including choir, strings group and recorder club.
Extra-curricular clubs are offered both at lunch times and after school between 3.45pm and 5pm.

Music
Music is part of the curriculum lessons, which include music theory, a history of music, and biographies of renowned musicians and composers.  There is a range of choirs, ensembles and Sherborne Prep provides most of the choristers for the Abbey Choir. Children who have reached Grade 5 or above can audition for the Joint Senior Schools Sinfonia.

Alumni
The school has a distinguished literary history, with a number of prominent writers attending the school, most notably John Cowper Powys and Louis MacNeice.

Historical abuse allegations
Sherborne Prep featured in an ITV documentary Boarding Schools: The Secret Shame with broadcaster and journalist Alex Renton in February 2018. Three survivors of child abuse spoke about their experience of Robin Lindsay who practised abuse across three decades or more while headmaster at the school. The MP for West Dorset, Rt Hon Sir Oliver Letwin, has supported calls for an inquiry into the handling of the allegations by the police and authorities. In April 2018 Dorset's Police and Crime Commissioner ruled out an inquiry saying he did not believe a new inquiry would "further justice". A 1993 report by Dorset Social Services was released by Dorset County Council in April 2018 following a Freedom of Information request by Somerset Live. The report confirmed that the Department for Education and police department had records regarding complaints about Lindsay's behaviour towards boarders in 1974, 1982, 1985 and 1986. The report raised questions regarding his suitability as headmaster, yet despite this Lindsay remained in post for another five years. A later report in 1997 said to be "damning in the extreme" was lost or destroyed. He was banned from teaching in 1998 by the Department for Education which found him to be a ‘fixated paedophile’.

A teacher at the school went to the police in 1985 to report allegations of abuse by Lindsay. He also approached the Independent Association of Preparatory Schools. But the chair at the time, Robin Peverett, did not assist, and according to reports in Devon Live the teacher was “warned off and threatened”. Peverett, headmaster of Dulwich Preparatory School until his retirement in 1990, later admitted nine counts of indecent assault on girls and a boy aged 11 to 13 between 1969 and 1978 and received an 18-month suspended sentence.

The School was approached by IISCA in November 2018 to confirm and provide information across a number of lines of inquiry under the Closed Schools Inquiry, which it did both willingly and openly.  IISCA recognised that despite having the same name, that the School under investigation was owned by a proprietorial Headmaster, Robin Lindsay, and is now closed.  The current School, despite having the same name is a registered charity. It is a different organisation to that which existed prior to 1998: It is an entirely different legal, financial and governance entity.  The Governing Board believe that it is important to be transparent and support the Inquiry with any information that it has.  As a consequence, the School applied to be a core participant.  Having done so, the Inquiry recognised that the School is a different entity to the one that existed when the allegations took place.

On 5 October 2018 it was announced by IICSA the Independent Inquiry into Child Sex Abuse, that Sherborne Prep would be one of the schools investigated within the Residential Schools Investigation.

References

External links
School Website
Profile on IAPS website
Profile on the ISC website
Profile on the Good Schools Guide
ISI Inspection Reports

Boarding schools in Dorset
Preparatory schools in Dorset
Educational institutions established in 1858
1858 establishments in England
Sherborne